Shiladitya Patranobis (1967 – 7 November 2008) was a prominent Indian TV and Bengali film actor. He began his acting career with the Doordarshan serial Sonar Sansar in the early 1990s. He worked in the Zee Bangla serials Rajpath and Rani Kahini.

He died of kidney failure in Calcutta. He was admitted to Kothari Medical Centre and Research Institute on 14 October 2008 with jaundice. His condition kept deteriorating. He was an alcoholic and had been to rehabilitation centres on two occasions. He had one daughter, from his first marriage, who resides in Toronto, Canada.

Filmography and Television 
 Bibar (2006)
 Ujaan Ganga
 Kuashar Araley
 Durga (Later REPLACED BY SAPTARSHI ROY)

References

Male actors in Bengali cinema
Bengali male actors
1967 births
2008 deaths
Indian Institute of Social Welfare and Business Management alumni
University of Calcutta alumni
Indian male film actors
Indian male television actors
Male actors in Hindi television
Male actors from Kolkata